Transmembrane protein 212 is a protein that in humans is encoded by the TMEM212 gene. The protein consists of 5 transmembrane domains and localizes in the plasma membrane and endoplasmic reticulum. TMEM212 has orthologs in vertebrates but not invertebrates. TMEM212 has been associated with sporadic Parkinson's disease, facial processing, and adiposity in African Americans.

Gene 

The TMEM212 gene is on chromosome 3 at position 3q26.3 and is located on the plus strand. The gene is encoded from position 171,561,140 to 171,577,108. Its longest isoform consists of 4 exons, a coding sequence of 1881 nucleotides, and an upstream in-frame stop codon. The coding sequence is the 36-660 bases of the gene TMEM212. Other genes in the gene neighborhood include: PLD1, RNU6-348P and FNDC3B.

Transcripts 
The gene TMEM212 has 2 isoforms. The mRNA splice variants of the TMEM212 vary at the last exon. One of the variants has spliced out part of the last exon—making it 537 nucleotides shorter. This isofrom has a mRNA sequence of 1343 nucleotides. The later variant has not been acknowledged in NCBI.

Protein 
TMEM212 has 5 transmembrane regions, making it a transmembrane protein. The 5 transmembrane regions are primarily non-polar amino acids. However, 2 of the transmembrane regions contain a polar, charged amino acid. The protein is 194 amino acids long and has a calculated molecular weight of 21kDa. The isoelectric point is at approximately a pH of 8. There are no internal repeats in the amino acid sequence of TMEM212. In addition, all amino acids are in normal abundance. Human TMEM212 displays a similar molecular weight and isoelectric point to its orthologs as displayed in Table 1.     Table 1: TMEM212 Protein Characteristics in Humans and Orthologs

Secondary and Tertiary Structure 
Phyre 2 and Ali2D predict TMEM212 to have a secondary structure rich in alpha helices, specifically in the transmembrane regions. The alpha helices were conserved in orthologs from mammals to reptiles. Additionally, DiANNA predicts TMEM212 to consist of 3 disulfide bonds between 6 cysteine amino acids: C46-C88, C105-C154, and C135-C16. The tertiary structure has 5 regions within the membrane.

Gene Level Regulation

Promoter 

According to Genomatix, TMEM212 has 3 possible promoters. However, the most likely promoter for TMEM212 is directly upstream the Gene of TMEM212 and is 1654 base pairs (GXP_277729).

Expression 
TMEM212 RNA is expressed lowly and ubiquitously in most tissue types (GDS1096). TMEM212 is expressed at a slightly higher level in the ovaries, brain, lungs, heart, kidneys, testes. TMEM212 was expressed in specific parts of the brain including the pons and trigeminal ganglion. Other tissues with moderate expression included the adrenal cortex and the appendix. In all available RNA-sequencing data shows TMEM212 is found in the lungs.

Transcript Level Regulation 
The 5' untranslated region is 35 base pairs long. The 3' untranslated region is 1221 base pairs in length and is located from base 661 to 1881. The lowest energy structure was predicted for the 5' UTR and 3' UTR.  Because of the short length, the 5' UTR was predicted to have 1 stem-loop. The 3' UTR is predicted to have 17 stem-loops.

Protein Level Regulation

Modification 
It is predicted that TMEM212 have two sulfation sites and one phosphorylation site. There is a potential cleavage signal peptide between amino acids 23 and 24.  The presence of the phosphorylation site and cleavage signal peptide is common among orthologs.

Subcellular Localization 
The primary subcellular locations include the plasma membrane and endoplasmic reticulum. The subcellular location of TMEM212 is conserved in orthologs. Immunofloursecent staining of TMEM212 antibodies show that TMEM212 is present in the nucleus, but the reason remains unknown. TMEM212 is less abundant than most proteins in humans.

Evolution

Paralog 
TMEM212 has one known paralog: Membrane-spanning 4 domains A7 (MS4A7). The gene is located on chromosome 11 at 11q12.2. MS4A7 likely evolved from TMEM212 435-475 million years ago. This is shown on the right where the divergence rates of different proteins are compared.

Orthologs 
TMEM212 in Homo sapiens is highly conserved. It is found in vertebrates but not invertebrates and has many orthologs including mammals, birds, reptiles, amphibians and fish. Table 2 below shows orthologs of TMEM212 in mammals, reptiles, birds, amphibians and fish. As displayed in the multiple sequence alignment to the right, strict orthologs such as mammals and reptiles have highly conserved regions. Most of the conserved areas fell where transmembrane regions are localized. TMEM212 is evolving moderately quickly compared to reference sequences Cytochrome C and Fibrinogen alpha.  This is shown to the right when comparing the divergence rates of TMEM212, MS4A7, Cytochrome C, and Fibrinogen Alpha.

*MYA = Millions of Years Ago

Interacting Proteins 
Three proteins were revealed to potentially interact with TMEM212: TMEM45A, GPR137C, and  HNRNPL. These proteins were identified experimentally through co-expression or affinity capture-RNA. They were also identified using textmining. TMEM45A and GPR137 are also found in the plasma membrane, similar to TMEM212 making this interaction likely.

Table 3: Proteins that Interact with TMEM212

Clinical Significance 
TMEM212 may be associated with adiposity in African Americans, facial processing, and sporadic Parkinson's disease. Increases in TMEM212 (mrna or protein) and high BMI in African Americans have shown a link because SNPs at a locus near TMEM212 have been associated with increased adiposity. Moreover, gene TMEM212 may also be involved in facial processing. Facial processing is genetically controlled, and in response to facial expressions, a common SNP found in TMEM212 led to the activation of the right fusiform gyrus area of the brain, which is important for facial processing. This specifically happened at 3q26.31. The SNP is number rs12485367. People with a G alle had higher activation compared to C homozygotes. TMEM212 may also be associated with Parkinson's Disease. Alterations in the SNP rs2270568 (Chromosome 3 position 172048861) in the TMEM212 gene changing the base T to C was associated with and increased incidence of Sporadic Parkinson's Disease.

References